The Annales Posonienses or Annals of Pressburg are the only extant early medieval annals written in the Kingdom of Hungary. However, they are rather a collection of notes which, as the historian Carlile Aylmer Macartney emphasizes, "hardly" deserves "the name of annals". The annals contain short records of events occurring between 997 and 1203. They are named after Pressburg (now Bratislava, Slovakia) where the Pray Codexthe manuscript preserving its textwas held at St. Martin's Cathedral until 1813 by the collegiate chapter.

References

Sources

Hungarian chronicles
Medieval Latin historical texts